North Carolina's 14th House district is one of 120 districts in the North Carolina House of Representatives. It has been represented by Republican George Cleveland since 2005.

Geography
Since 2003, the district has included part of Onslow County. The district overlaps with the 6th Senate district.

District officeholders since 1985

Single-member district

Multi-member district

Single-member district

Election results

2022

2020

2018

2016

2014

2012

2010

2008

2006

2004

2002

2000

References

North Carolina House districts
Onslow County, North Carolina